Cyphochilus is a genus of beetles with unusually bright white scales that cover the whole exoskeleton. Cyphochilus inhabit Southeast Asia.

Etymology 
Probably the same etymology as the former Cyphochilus orchid: from the Greek kyphos meaning "bent" and cheilos meaning "lip", because of the reflexed lip.

External morphology 
The whiteness of the scales is caused by a thin disordered photonic structure (≈7 μm) which scatters light of all wavelengths with the same efficiency, thus resulting in a white colouration. This is particularly interesting as the beetle's exoskeleton underneath the scales is black, meaning that the scattering events must be very efficient in order to achieve such high opaqueness.

The white scales are composed of sclerotin, a modified form of the polymer chitin, and are whiter than paper or any artificial material produced so far. That is they have a scattering mean free path shorter than any natural material thanks to the anisotropy in the spatial architecture of the fibres, which ensures a high packing efficiency whilst preventing optical crowding.

Ecology

Camouflage 
The beetles are believed to have developed white coloration to be camouflaged among white fungi. The chitin filaments are just a few micrometres thick – far thinner than a very fine sheet of paper. The elements are tightly packed, scattering light efficiently, but still able to keep a degree of disorder in their shape. It has been shown how this strategy is evolutionarily optimised to produce bright whiteness despite the low refractive index of sclerotin.

As inspiration for technologies 
Scientists have exploited the topology of the random network to fabricate materials of comparable performance for application as ultra-white paints and coatings. For instance, in 2018 Syurik et al. have developed a bioinspired PMMA-based material which scatters light efficiently whilst being flexible and switchable in appearance.

Another recent example consists of the use of cellulose nanofibrils to fabricate ultra-white paper for cosmetics and coatings.

References

Scarabaeidae genera
Melolonthinae